The Al-Rahman Mosque (transliterates: The Most Merciful) in Baghdad, was intended to be one of the largest mosques in Iraq. It was begun by Saddam Hussein in 1998, but work was cut short during the 2003 invasion of Iraq and it was never completed. It remains uncompleted in Baghdad's Mansour neighbourhood, in the place of the old race track. Its main, uncompleted dome, is surrounded by eight smaller, independent domes, which in turn feature eight even smaller domes integrated in their walls.

Disambiguation 
The mosque is sometimes confused with another mosque – the "Great Saddam Mosque", (or "Grand Saddam Mosque") which was also being built at the time. That was being constructed a couple of miles to the north-east, at the site of the old Al Muthanna municipal airport. It was supposed to be even bigger than Al-Rahman, and centred on an artificial lake. Construction of this mosque was at an even earlier stage when stopped, with only some central columns built.

See also 

 Islam in Iraq
 List of mosques in Baghdad

References

External links 

1998 establishments in Iraq
Mosques in Baghdad